Tustin is a census-designated place in the Town of Bloomfield, Waushara County, Wisconsin, United States. Its population was 117 as of the 2010 census. Tustin is located on the northern shore of Lake Poygan.

Notable people
Robert H. Boyson, Wisconsin State Assemblyman, was born in Tustin.

References

Census-designated places in Waushara County, Wisconsin
Census-designated places in Wisconsin